Pam John is a former Welsh international lawn bowler.

Bowls career
She was born in 1943 and won the bronze medal in the fours with Gill Miles, Ann Sutherland and Nina Shipperlee at the 2002 Commonwealth Games in Manchester.

She was a Welsh international from 1989 until 1997 and still bowls for the Cardiff Bowling Club.

References

Living people
1943 births
Bowls players at the 2002 Commonwealth Games
Commonwealth Games medallists in lawn bowls
Welsh female bowls players
Commonwealth Games bronze medallists for Wales
Medallists at the 2002 Commonwealth Games